Portugal selected its entry for the Eurovision Song Contest 2001 through the Festival da Canção contest, organised by the Portuguese broadcaster Rádio e Televisão de Portugal (RTP). The winner of the festival was MTM with the song "Só sei ser feliz assim", which represented Portugal at the Contest in Copenhagen, Denmark on 12 May 2001.

Before Eurovision

Festival da Canção 2001 
Before the final on 7 March 2001, five semi-finals were held monthly throughout October 2000 and February 2001, featuring ten songs each.

Semi-final 1
The first semi-final was held at Forum Municipal Luísa Todi in Setúbal on 20 October 2000, hosted by Sónia Araújo and Cristina Möhler. Ten entries competed, which two advanced to the final based on the votes of a five-member jury panel.

Semi-final 2
The second semi-final was held at Teatro José Lúcio da Silva in Leiria on 17 November 2000, hosted by Sónia Araújo and Cristina Möhler. Ten entries competed, which two advanced to the final based on the votes of a five-member jury panel.

Semi-final 3
The third semi-final was held at Conservatório Regional do Algarve in Faro on 15 December 2000, hosted by Sónia Araújo and Cristina Möhler. Ten entries competed, which two advanced to the final based on the votes of a five-member jury panel.

Semi-final 4
The fourth semi-final was held at Teatro Municipal Baltazar Dias in Funchal on 19 January 2001, hosted by Sónia Araújo and Cristina Möhler. Ten entries competed, which two advanced to the final based on the votes of a five-member jury panel.

Semi-final 5
The first semi-final was held at Teatro Micaelense in Ponta Delgada on 16 February 2001, hosted by Sónia Araújo and Cristina Möhler. Ten entries competed, which two advanced to the final based on the votes of a five-member jury panel.

Final 
The final was held at Europarque in Santa Maria da Feira on 7 March 2001, hosted by Sónia Araújo and Cristina Möhler. However it wasn't broadcast until 11 March 2001 due to the collapse of a bridge over the River Douro in Northern Portugal, following which several days of mourning were held. The winner was chosen by 20 regional juries.

At Eurovision

Voting

References

External links
Portuguese National Final 2001

2001
Countries in the Eurovision Song Contest 2001
Eurovision